Galway's Land National Park is a small  national park, consisting of dense montane forest. It was formally declared as a wildlife sanctuary on 27 May 1938. The Galway's Land was elevated to national park status on 18 May 2006. The park was declared to conserve the montane ecosystems. Field Ornithology Group of Sri Lanka considers that Victoria Park in Nuwara Eliya and Galway's Land are two of the most significant birding sites in Sri Lanka. Galway's Land harbours about 20 rare migrant bird species and 30 native species. Apart from the avifauna, the park has valuable floral species of both native and foreign origin. Galway Forest Lodge is located close to the park.

See also
 Protected areas of Sri Lanka

References

National parks of Sri Lanka
Nuwara Eliya
Protected areas established in 1938
Protected areas in Central Province, Sri Lanka